Castelblanco is a Spanish surname. Notable people with the surname include:

Jorge Castelblanco (born 1987), long-distance runner from Panama
José Castelblanco (born 1969), Colombian cyclist

Spanish-language surnames